Latrobe station is an Amtrak intercity rail station located in Latrobe, Pennsylvania. The station is near the center of the city, and is currently served only by Amtrak's Pennsylvanian, which operates once per day in each direction.

The historic station itself exists, but currently serves as a restaurant. There is no ticket office available at the small shelter (complete with bench seats) which serves as the current station. Due to the small number of passengers, Latrobe Station is a flag stop.

History 

The station was opened in 1903 by the Pennsylvania Railroad as part of a project to elevate the right-of-way as it passed through Latrobe. The architect, William H. Brown, used an eclectic Late Victorian style. It is a one-story, brick building, eight bays wide and five bays deep. It has a flat roof with parapet and a central cross gable. The gable end over the main entrance has a pediment with stone panels and terra cotta decoration. The station was listed on the National Register of Historic Places in 1986.

Until 2005, Latrobe was served by a second daily train, the Three Rivers (a replacement service for the legendary Broadway Limited), an extended version of the Pennsylvanian that terminated in Chicago. Upon its cancellation, the sole Pennsylvanian marked the first time in Latrobe's railway history that the town was served by just a single, daily passenger train.

The Westmoreland County Transit Authority has one bus route, Route 9/9A – Greensburg/Latrobe/Derry, that stops adjacent to the train station and one other route, Route 20F – New Florence/Greensburg, that stops within  of the station.

References

External links 

Latrobe Amtrak Station (USA Rail Guide -- Train Web)

Amtrak stations in Pennsylvania
Stations on the Pittsburgh Line
Railway stations on the National Register of Historic Places in Pennsylvania
Railway stations in the United States opened in 1903
Victorian architecture in Pennsylvania
Latrobe, Pennsylvania
National Register of Historic Places in Westmoreland County, Pennsylvania
Former Pennsylvania Railroad stations